The 2011 Los Angeles Galaxy season was the club's 17th year of existence as well as their 16th season in Major League Soccer and their 16th consecutive year in the top-flight of American soccer. The Galaxy entered the season as the defending MLS Supporters' Shield titleholders.

Most notably, the Galaxy became the third straight team to win consecutive Supporters' Shields, after D.C. United (2006–07) and Columbus Crew (2008–09). The Galaxy clinched their fourth Shield on October 8, after Seattle Sounders FC lost 0–2 at home to Philadelphia Union. They also won their third MLS Cup, defeating Houston Dynamo 1–0 in the final.

Outside of league play, the Galaxy participated in the CONCACAF Champions League and the U.S. Open Cup, reaching the Quarterfinals in both competitions. Along with these competitive tournaments, the Galaxy played in the friendly-match World Football Challenge, losing to Real Madrid and drawing to Manchester City.

Their record in all competitions (yet excluding their Asia-Pacific tour) was 28–9–11, earning 95/144 points from 48 matches.

Season summary

Preseason

The Galaxy had a busy month in January, mostly with transfers. On January 10, club striker, and Golden Boot-finalist, Edson Buddle left the Galaxy to sign with second division German club, Ingolstadt 04 through the end of the 2012–13 2. Bundesliga season.

On January 9, 2010, rumors about David Beckham potentially ending his three and a half year MLS career by signing with Tottenham Hotspur or going on loan with the Premier League club ended. The Galaxy announced that Beckham would be training with Tottenham for two weeks, before joining Los Angeles for the start of pre-season training. The news made it the first time since 2008 that Beckham did not go on an off-season loan to Europe.

Regular season

March

The Galaxy opened the MLS regular season with a 0–1 victory over the Sounders at Qwest Field in rainy Seattle on March 15. Second-year midfielder Juninho had the lone goal of the match. Although they were back home at the Home Depot Center for the second match of the season on March 20, the Galaxy once again played in the rain. A rare Southern California rainstorm made for difficult conditions in the 1–1 draw with the New England Revolution. Juninho scored the equalizer for the Galaxy, his second goal of the season – which already matched his goal total from his debut 2010 season. The toughest test of the early season came on March 26 – and the Galaxy failed. Traveling to Rio Tinto Stadium in Sandy, Utah without captain Landon Donovan (who was away on international duty with the USA national team), the Galaxy lost 4–1 to Real Salt Lake. To be fair, Rio Tinto is a difficult venue for any visiting club, as Real hasn't lost at home in nearly two years. The only consolation was seeing Juan Pablo Ángel open his Galaxy goal account in his first start for his new club. Ángel had been suffering from a virus and didn't start the first two matches (though he did come on as a substitute in the second half against the Revolution).

April

The Galaxy rebounded from the loss to Real Salt Lake with a 1–0 victory over the Philadelphia Union at the Home Depot Center on April 2. Donovan Ricketts and Omar Gonzalez saw their first action of the season after recovering from minor injuries. Leonardo headed in a David Beckham free kick in the 33rd minute for the game's only goal. It was the defender's first goal in a Galaxy shirt. A 53rd minute red card for Chris Birchall meant that the Galaxy had to spend the majority of the second half protecting their narrow lead a man down.

Next up was a 3-games-in-8-days cross-country road trip. To complicate matters, the Galaxy would be without captain Landon Donovan, who did not travel with the club while he nursed a knee injury. The first match of the trip came at RFK Stadium in Washington, D.C. on April 9. Mike Magee nodded in a Beckham corner to give the Galaxy the early lead. But Charlie Davies drew a dubious penalty and converted from the spot himself in the 90th minute to save the draw for D.C. United. The squad traveled to Toronto to take on Toronto FC 4 days later. The fans at BMO Field saw a largely unentertaining affair resulting in a scoreless draw. Most notable from a Galaxy perspective was the sending off of Juninho in stoppage time of the 2nd half. Also, Beckham received his 5th yellow card of the season in the 44th minute. These two events meant that the Galaxy would be without 3/4ths of their preferred midfield (Donovan, Beckham, and Juninho) when they finished their trip on April 17 in Bridgeview, Illinois against the Chicago Fire. Yet it was no problem as the Galaxy won 1–2 behind goals from Chad Barrett and Gonzalez with Miguel López providing the assists on both goals. Although there was one concerning casualty on the Toyota Park field – Leonardo picked up a right knee injury late in the match. It was revealed a couple days later that he tore the ACL and LCL in the knee, and he is expected to miss the remainder of the season. Heading home to LA, the Galaxy had picked up a very respectable 5 points on their travels.

Squad

Roster

Squad information

Transfers

In

Out

Loans

In

Out

Competitions

Pre-season

Major League Soccer

Overall table

Western Conference table

Results summary

Results by round

Match results

MLS Cup Playoffs

Conference semifinals

Conference finals

Championship

CONCACAF Champions League

The Los Angeles Galaxy qualified directly into Group Stage play by winning the Supporters' Shield. The Galaxy played in Group A with Alajuelense of Costa Rica, Morelia of Mexico, and Motagua of Honduras.

U.S. Open Cup

World Football Challenge

Asia Pacific Tour 2011

Statistics

All statistics are for competitive matches only.

Appearances and goals

Goalkeeper stats

{| border="1" cellpadding="4" cellspacing="0" style="margin: 1em 1em 1em 1em 0; background: #f9f9f9; border: 1px #aaa solid; border-collapse: collapse; font-size: 95%; text-align: center;"
|-
| rowspan="2" style="width:1%; text-align:center;"|No.
| rowspan="2" style="width:1%; text-align:center;"|Nat.
| rowspan="2" style="width:30%; text-align:center;"|Player
| colspan="3" style="text-align:center;"|Total
| colspan="3" style="text-align:center;"|MLS
| colspan="3" style="text-align:center;"|Champions League
| colspan="3" style="text-align:center;"|Open Cup
|-
|MIN
|GA
|GAA
|MIN
|GA
|GAA
|MIN
|GA
|GAA
|MIN
|GA
|GAA
|-
| style="text-align: right;" |1
|
| style="text-align: left;" |Donovan Ricketts
|1014
|6
|0.53
|1014
|6
|0.53
|0
|0
|0.00
|0
|0
|0.00
|-
| style="text-align: right;" |12
|
| style="text-align: left;" |Josh Saunders
|1459
|17
|1.05
|1189
|14
|1.06
|180
|0
|0.00
|90
|3
|3.00
|-
| style="text-align: right;" |18
|
| style="text-align: left;" |Mike Magee
|47
|0
|0.00
|47
|0
|0.00
|0
|0
|0.00
|0
|0
|0.00
|-
| style="text-align: right;" |24
|
| style="text-align: left;" |Brian Perk
|180
|1
|0.50
|90
|0
|0.00
|0
|0
|0.00
|90
|1
|1.00
|-
|
|
| TOTALS
|2700
|24
|0.80
|2340
|20
|0.77
|180
|0
|0.00
|180
|4
|2.00
|-

Starting XI
MLS regular season matches only.

Top scorers

{| class="wikitable" style="font-size: 95%; text-align: center;"
|-
!width=60|Rank
!width=60|Nation
!width=60|Number
!width=150|Name
!width=80|Total
!width=80|MLS
!width=80|Champions League
!width=80|Open Cup
|-
|1
|
|10
|Landon Donovan
|13
|12
|1
|0
|-
|2
|
|11
|Chad Barrett
|5
|4
|1
|0
|-
|3
|
|5
|Sean Franklin
|4
|4
|0
|0
|-
|3
|
|4
|Omar Gonzalez
|4
|2
|1
|1
|-
|3
|
|19
|Juninho
|4
|4
|0
|0
|-
|3
|
|18
|Mike Magee
|4
|3
|0
|1
|-
|3
|
|9
|Juan Pablo Ángel
|4
|4
|0
|0
|-
|8
|
|17
|Adam Cristman
|3
|1
|1
|1
|-
|9
|
|23
|David Beckham
|2
|2
|0
|0
|-
|10
|
|8
|Chris Birchall
|1
|1
|0
|0
|-
|10
|
|14
|Robbie Keane
|1
|1
|0
|0
|-
|10
|
|22
|Leonardo
|1
|1
|0
|0
|-
|10
|
|25
|Miguel López
|1
|1
|0
|0
|-

Top assists

{| class="wikitable" style="font-size: 95%; text-align: center;"
|-
!width=60|Rank
!width=60|Nation
!width=60|Number
!width=150|Name
!width=80|Total
!width=80|MLS
!width=80|Champions League
!width=80|Open Cup
|-
|1
|
|23
|David Beckham
|14
|12
|2
|0
|-
|2
|
|11
|Chad Barrett
|3
|3
|0
|0
|-
|2
|
|10
|Landon Donovan
|3
|3
|0
|0
|-
|2
|
|5
|Sean Franklin
|3
|2
|1
|0
|-
|2
|
|25
|Miguel López
|3
|2
|0
|0
|-
|6
|
|2
|Todd Dunivant
|2
|2
|0
|0
|-
|6
|
|19
|Juninho
|2
|1
|0
|1
|-
|8
|
|9
|Juan Pablo Ángel
|1
|1
|0
|0
|-
|8
|
|3
|Gregg Berhalter
|1
|1
|0
|0
|-
|8
|
|8
|Chris Birchall
|1
|0
|0
|1
|-
|8
|
|20
|A. J. DeLaGarza
|1
|0
|1
|0
|-
|8
|
|4
|Omar Gonzalez
|1
|0
|0
|1
|-

Disciplinary record

{| class="wikitable" style="font-size: 95%; text-align: center;"
|-
| rowspan="2" style="width:5%; text-align:center;"|Position
| rowspan="2" style="width:5%; text-align:center;"|Nation
| rowspan="2" style="width:5%; text-align:center;"|Number
| rowspan="2" style="width:15%; text-align:center;"|Name
| colspan="2" style="text-align:center;"|Total
| colspan="2" style="text-align:center;"|MLS
| colspan="2" style="text-align:center;"|Champions League
| colspan="2" style="text-align:center;"|Open Cup
|-
! style="width:60px; background:#fe9;"|
! style="width:60px; background:#ff8888;"|
! style="width:60px; background:#fe9;"|
! style="width:60px; background:#ff8888;"|
! style="width:60px; background:#fe9;"|
! style="width:60px; background:#ff8888;"|
! style="width:60px; background:#fe9;"|
! style="width:60px; background:#ff8888;"|
|-
| GK
|
| 1
| Donovan Ricketts
|100
|100
|1
|0
|0
|0
|0
|0
|-
| DF
|
| 2
| Todd Dunivant
|2
|0
|2
|0
|0
|0
|0
|0
|-
| DF
|
| 3
| Gregg Berhalter
|4
|0
|2
|0
|1
|0
|1
|0
|-
| DF
|
| 4
| Omar Gonzalez
|2
|0
|2
|0
|0
|0
|0
|0
|-
| DF
|
| 5
| Sean Franklin
|2
|0
|2
|0
|0
|0
|0
|0
|-
| DF
|
| 6
| Frankie Hejduk
|2
|0
|2
|0
|0
|0
|0
|0
|-
| MF
|
| 7
| Jovan Kirovski
|0
|1
|0
|1
|0
|0
|0
|0
|-
| MF
|
| 8
| Chris Birchall
|3
|1
|3
|1
|0
|0
|0
|0
|-
| FW
|
| 10
| Landon Donovan
|4
|0
|3
|0
|1
|0
|0
|0
|-
| GK
|
| 12
| Josh Saunders
|1
|1
|1
|1
|0
|0
|0
|0
|-
| FW
|
| 17
| Adam Cristman
|1
|0
|0
|0
|0
|0
|1
|0
|-
| FW
|
| 18
| Mike Magee
|3
|0
|2
|0
|1
|0
|0
|0
|-
| MF
|
| 19
| Juninho
|4
|2
|4
|1
|0
|1
|0
|0
|-
| DF
|
| 20
| A. J. DeLaGarza
|2
|0
|2
|0
|0
|0
|0
|0
|-
| DF
|
| 22
| Leonardo
|1
|0
|1
|0
|0
|0
|0
|0
|-
| MF
|
| 23
| David Beckham
|10
|0
|9
|0
|1
|0
|0
|0
|-
| MF
|
| 25
| Miguel López
|2
|0
|2
|0
|0
|0
|0
|0
|-
| MF
|
| 26
| Michael Stephens
|3
|0
|3
|0
|0
|0
|0
|0
|-
| FW
|
| 27
| Bryan Jordan
|1
|0
|1
|0
|0
|0
|0
|0
|-
| MF
|
| 30
| Paolo Cardozo
|1
|0
|0
|0
|0
|0
|1
|0
|-
|
|
|
| TOTALS
|46
|5
|39
|4
|4
|1
|3
|0
|-

Club staff
{|class="wikitable"
|-
!Position
!Name
|-
|General Manager & Head Coach|| Bruce Arena
|-
|Assistant head coach|| Dave Sarachan
|-
|Assistant coach & Reserve Team Head Coach|| Curt Onalfo
|-
|Assistant coach|| Gregg Berhalter
|-
|Goalkeeper coach|| Ian Feuer
|-
|Director of Soccer Operations|| David Kammarman
|-
|Senior Director Galaxy Academy & Special Projects|| Chris Klein
|-
|LA Galaxy Academy Coach & Administrator|| Craig Harrington
|-
|Head Athletic Trainer|| Armando Rivas
|-
|Assistant Athletic Trainer|| Cecelia Gutierrez
|-
|Equipment Manager|| Raul Vargas
|-
|Equipment Coordinator|| Rafael Verdin
|-
|Team Administrator|| Shant Kasparian
|-
|Strength & Conditioning Coach|| Ben Yauss
|-
|Active Release Specialist|| Shunta Shimizu
|-

Miscellany

Allocation ranking
Los Angeles is in the No. 10 position in the MLS Allocation Ranking. The allocation ranking is the mechanism used to determine which MLS club has first priority to acquire a U.S. National Team player who signs with MLS after playing abroad, or a former MLS player who returns to the league after having gone to a club abroad for a transfer fee. A ranking can be traded, provided that part of the compensation received in return is another club's ranking.

International roster spots
Los Angeles has 8 international roster spots. Each club in Major League Soccer is allocated 8 international roster spots, which can be traded. Los Angeles dealt one slot to Portland Timbers on November 22, 2010, for use in the 2011 and 2012 seasons then acquired one slot from D.C. United on February 17, 2011, for use in the 2011 and 2012 seasons. There is no limit on the number of international slots on each club's roster. The remaining roster slots must belong to domestic players. For clubs based in the United States, a domestic player is either a U.S. citizen, a permanent resident (green card holder) or the holder of other special status (e.g., refugee or asylum status).

Future draft pick trades
Future picks acquired: 2012 Supplemental Draft Round 3 pick acquired from Chivas USA.
Future picks traded: 2014 SuperDraft Round 4 pick traded to Houston Dynamo. The Galaxy also traded unspecified future considerations to Toronto FC which may or may not include draft pick(s).

MLS rights to other players
Los Angeles maintains the MLS rights to Edson Buddle after the player declined a contract offer by the league and signed overseas on a free transfer.

References

External links
 LA Galaxy
 2011 Los Angeles Galaxy season at ESPN
 2011 Media Guide

LA Galaxy seasons
Los Angeles Galaxy
Los Angeles Galaxy
Los Angeles Galaxy
MLS Cup champion seasons
2011